Sérgio Oliveira (born 18 May 1967) is a Brazilian judoka. He competed in the men's lightweight event at the 1992 Summer Olympics.

References

1967 births
Living people
Brazilian male judoka
Olympic judoka of Brazil
Judoka at the 1992 Summer Olympics
Sportspeople from São Paulo
Pan American Games medalists in judo
Pan American Games silver medalists for Brazil
Pan American Games bronze medalists for Brazil
Judoka at the 1991 Pan American Games
Judoka at the 1995 Pan American Games
20th-century Brazilian people
21st-century Brazilian people